Enteromius devosi is a species of ray-finned fish in the genus Enteromius. It is found in the Malagarasi River drainage in Burundi and Tanzania.

The fish is named in honor of Luc De Vos (1957-2003), who was the first to recognize this species as undescribed and new to science.

References

Enteromius
Cyprinid fish of Africa
Taxa named by Gaspard Banyankimbona
Taxa named by Emmanuel J. Vreven
Taxa named by Jos Snoeks
Fish described in 2012